The 1973 Lehigh Engineers football team was an American football team that represented Lehigh University as an independent during the 1973 NCAA Division II football season. Lehigh lost in the quarterfinal round of the national playoffs, and won the Lambert Cup.

In their ninth year under head coach Fred Dunlap, the Engineers compiled a 7–4–1 record (7–3–1  in the regular season). Kim McQuilken and Roger McFillin were the team captains. McQuilken completed 62.5% of his passes for 2,603 yards and 19 touchdowns and was selected by the Associated Press as the first-team quarterback on the 1973 Little All-America college football team.

Although they did not appear at any point in the 1973 small-college AP or UPI national polls, the Engineers earned a share of the Lambert Cup, awarded to the best team from a mid-sized college in the East. Lehigh shared the honor with Delaware, which had started the year ranked No. 1 and ended at No. 10. 

Both Delaware and Lehigh also qualified for the first-ever NCAA Division II national playoff. Lehigh lost a road game to No. 2 Western Kentucky.

Lehigh played its home games at Taylor Stadium on the university campus in Bethlehem, Pennsylvania.

Schedule

References

Lehigh
Lehigh Mountain Hawks football seasons
Lehigh Engineers football